Darryl Eugene "D. J." Strawberry Jr. (born June 15, 1985) is an American-born naturalized Cameroonian professional basketball player for Zamalek SC of the Egyptian Basketball Super League. He is the son of former Major League Baseball player Darryl Strawberry.

High school career
While living in Corona, California, Strawberry attended Mater Dei High School in Santa Ana. During Strawberry's senior year at Mater Dei, he defended future NBA superstar LeBron James in a nationally televised matchup against St. Vincent–St. Mary High School of Akron, Ohio. Strawberry was lauded for his efforts, which included holding James to a 33% shooting performance (8 for 24 from the field), and 0 for 8 from beyond the three-point line).

Considered a four-star recruit by 247Sports.com, Strawberry was listed as the No. 15 shooting guard and the No. 84 player in the nation in 2003.

College career
Strawberry assumed the role of a swingman for the Maryland Terrapins, and he was much valued for his on-the-ball defense. He averaged nearly 2 steals per game, leading his team in that category. He was also valued for his off-the-bench intensity; it is felt that Maryland's absence from the 2005 NCAA tournament was due in no small part to a season-ending ACL injury Strawberry suffered in mid-January of that year.

While he was primarily a swingman, a lack of depth pressed Strawberry into the role of point guard during his junior year. He had various degrees of success in this new role, leading the team in both assists (4.0) and turnovers per game (2.9).

Strawberry received Honorable Mention All-ACC Freshman honors. During his junior year, he received Honorable Mention All-ACC Defensive Team honors, becoming the eighth player in Maryland history to lead the team in both steals and assists. In his senior season, Strawberry was voted to second team All-ACC.

Professional career
Strawberry was drafted by the Phoenix Suns with the 59th selection in the 2007 NBA draft. He was signed on August 28, 2007 to a two-year contract.

NBA D-League
On December 18, 2007, it was announced he was assigned to the Albuquerque Thunderbirds of the NBA D-League. He was named Performer of the Week for the week ending January 6. Strawberry was recalled to the Suns in place of another rookie, Alando Tucker, on January 10, 2008.

2008–09 season
On August 25, 2008, he was traded to the Houston Rockets for Sean Singletary, but was waived on October 24. Six days later, he signed with the Italian club Fortitudo Bologna for the rest of the season.

In April, 2009, he suffered a meniscus injury to his left knee, ending his season in Italy. He then returned to the United States for surgery, and in July, 2009 he began a 6-month program in Los Angeles.

2009–present
In January 2010, Strawberry joined the Reno Bighorns of the NBA D-League.

In July 2010, Strawberry joined the Los Angeles Lakers for the 2010 NBA summer league. On September 17, 2010, he was signed by the New Orleans Hornets to a non-guaranteed one-year deal. However, he was later waived by the Hornets on October 20. Afterwards, Strawberry re-signed with the Reno Bighorns. On January 18, 2011, he signed with Lietuvos rytas of Lithuania until the end of the 2010–11 season.

On August 26, 2011, Strawberry signed a two-year deal with the Israeli club Hapoel Migdal. After one season in which he averaged 15.6 points in the Israeli League, he parted ways with Hapoel on June 25, 2012.

On September 20, 2012, Strawberry signed with the Croatian club Cibona. On June 22, 2013, Strawberry signed with the Capitanes de Arecibo of Puerto Rico for the 2013 BSN season. On July 12, 2013, he re-signed with Cibona. On December 25, 2013, he was released by Cibona due to financial problems of the club. Two days later, he signed with Pau-Lacq-Orthez of France for the rest of the season.

On June 27, 2014, he signed with Piratas de Quebradillas of Puerto Rico for the 2014 BSN season. On July 2, 2014, he signed a one-year deal with Pınar Karşıyaka of the Turkish Basketball League.

On July 2, 2015, he signed a two-year contract with the Greek club and EuroLeague powerhouse Olympiacos. After one season, he parted ways with Olympiacos.

On July 22, 2016, Strawberry signed with Turkish club Beşiktaş for the 2016–17 season. On July 3, 2017, he re-signed with Beşiktaş for one more season.

On July 29, 2018, Strawberry signed a one-year deal with Herbalife Gran Canaria of the Liga ACB and the EuroLeague.

On October 31, 2019, he has signed with Orléans Loiret Basket of the French Pro A.

In June 2020 he signed for one term at Liga ACB team UCAM Murcia. Strawberry parted ways with the team on June 30, 2021.

He re-joined Orléans Loiret Basket on December 6, 2021.

On January 30, 2022, Strawberry signed with Zamalek SC of the Egyptian Basketball Super League. On February 12, he made his debut for the team when he recorded 5 points and 3 rebounds against Burgos in the 2022 FIBA Intercontinental Cup semifinal.

Cameroon national team
In 2017, Strawberry was cleared to play with the senior men's Cameroon national basketball team.

NBA career statistics

Regular season

|-
| align="left" | 2007–08
| align="left" | Phoenix
| 33 || 0 || 8.2 || .315 || .240 || .474 || .8 || .9 || .4 || .2 || 2.2
|-
| align="left" | Career
| align="left" | 
| 33 || 0 || 8.2 || .315 || .240 || .474 || .8 || .9 || .4 || .1 || 2.2

Playoffs

|-
| align="left" | 2007–08
| align="left" | Phoenix
| 1 || 0 || 5.0 || .000 || .000 || .000 || 1.0 || .0 || .0 || .0 || .0
|-
| align="left" | Career
| align="left" | 
| 1 || 0 || 5.0 || .000 || .000 || .000 || 1.0 || .0 || .0 || .0 || .0

References

External links
 Euroleague.net Profile
 DraftExpress.com profile
 Greek Basket League Profile 
 Italian League Profile 
 FIBA.com profile
 Eurobasket.com profile
 NBA.com Profile 
 ESPN.com profile
 NBA.com draft prospect profile
 Maryland Terrapins bio
 TBLStat.net Profile

1985 births
Living people
20th-century African-American people
21st-century African-American sportspeople
ABA League players
African-American basketball players
American expatriate basketball people in Croatia
American expatriate basketball people in France
American expatriate basketball people in Greece
American expatriate basketball people in Israel
American expatriate basketball people in Italy
American expatriate basketball people in Lithuania
American expatriate basketball people in Spain
American expatriate basketball people in Turkey
American men's basketball players
Basketball players from New York City
Basketball players from California
BC Rytas players
Beşiktaş men's basketball players
Cameroonian men's basketball players
Cameroonian expatriate basketball people in Spain
CB Gran Canaria players
CB Murcia players
Élan Béarnais players
Fortitudo Pallacanestro Bologna players
Hapoel Jerusalem B.C. players
Karşıyaka basketball players
KK Cibona players
Liga ACB players
Maryland Terrapins men's basketball players
Olympiacos B.C. players
Orléans Loiret Basket players
People with acquired Cameroonian citizenship
Naturalized citizens of Cameroon
Phoenix Suns draft picks
Phoenix Suns players
Piratas de Quebradillas players
Point guards
Reno Bighorns players
Shooting guards
Small forwards
Sportspeople from Corona, California
Zamalek SC basketball players